Sprachgitter is a 1959 German-language poetry collection by Paul Celan, published by S. Fischer Verlag. It was translated to English by Joachim Groschel in 1971 as Speech-Grille, and as Language Mesh by Michael Hamburger in 1988.

References

1959 poetry books
Poetry by Paul Celan
German poetry collections
Romanian poetry collections
S. Fischer Verlag books